Headquartered in Washington, D.C., The School for Ethics and Global Leadership (SEGL) is a selective, semester-long residential program for intellectually motivated high school juniors from across the United States. The program selects students who have shown outstanding character, promise for leadership, and scholastic ability and provides them with a unique curriculum that emphasizes ethical thinking, leadership development, and international affairs.

History
Educator Noah Bopp founded SEGL in response to the September 11, 2001, attacks. SEGL matriculated its first class of students on August 29, 2009. It opened a second campus in partnership with the African Leadership Academy in 2020. The school has announced a third campus, in London, United Kingdom, to open in 2023-24. Since its inception, the school has graduated over 800 students originating from all fifty states.

School life
Students at SEGL take courses based on a block schedule. Students take Ethics and Leadership for two hours on Monday morning, all day Wednesday, and for two hours on Friday afternoon. Other courses have regular 50-minute and longer block periods. All DC students also take an introductory Arabic and Chinese language and culture course. Along with the specialized SEGL curriculum, students take courses that match sending school requirements. The school also hosts a Summer Ethics and Leadership Institute in London and offers several summer international excursions. Visits with prominent guest speakers are a core aspect of the Ethics and Leadership course, occurring almost every week of the semester. Guests have included Supreme Court Justice Clarence Thomas, Senator Cory Booker, General Stanley A. McChrystal, Egil "Bud" Krogh, Carl Wilkens, Lissa Muscatine, Jack Abramoff, Ambassador Mark Dybul, Senator Chuck Schumer, former White House Press Secretary Mike McCurry, NRA President David Keene, Governor Michael Dukakis, and former President Barack Obama. The DC campus academic building is a block from Dupont Circle. Its residential building is half a block from the U.S. Supreme Court and one block from the U.S. Capitol building on Capitol Hill. The Johannesburg location is part of the African Leadership Academy campus in Johannesburg, South Africa. The London campus is one block from the British Museum.

Leadership Council

 Ambassador David Abshire, former U.S. Ambassador to NATO
 Ambassador Mark Dybul, Executive Director, The Global Fund to Fight AIDS, TB, and Malaria
 Ambassador Donald Mahley, Deputy Assistant Secretary of State for Arm Control Implementation
 Academic Abdul Aziz Said, Former Professor of International Relations at American University
 Activist Carl Wilkens, Former Director, ADRA in Rwanda (1993-4)
 Colman McCarthy, Columnist at The Washington Post
 Egil Krogh, Advisor to President Richard Nixon
 Lissa Muscatine, Chief of Speechwriting, U.S. Department of State

Notable alumni 

 H.D. Wright, Writer

References

Philosophy education
Ethics organizations
Semester schools